Catharine first appeared in the registers in 1809 as American-built and having undergone repairs in that year. In 1811 she became a whaler and sailed to the Pacific where the United States Navy captured her. Her captors sailed her to Valparaiso to sell her but when they were unable to do so they took her out to sea and burned her in February 1814.

Career

Captain Thomas Folger was a native of Nantucket.

Capture and loss

While nearing James Island in the afternoon on May 28, lookouts aboard USS Georgiana sighted a mast and sails on the horizon. When the Americans were within range they lowered a few boats filled with men and captured the two sloops without resistance. Then the Americans spotted and captured a third vessel . The Americans disarmed Rose and put the bulk of their prisoners aboard her, sending her to Saint Helena as a cartel

Lloyd's List reported that the American sent Hector and Catharine to Tombus. It further reported that although Rose had been sent for England, she proved leaky and had to put into Lima.

Actually, Georgiana took Catharine and Hector to rendezvous with Captain Porter and the  there. The Americans were unable to sell Hector, Catharine, or Montezuma.

In early 1814 Porter arrived at Valparaiso. He towed Hector and Catharine out to sea and burned them, probably on 14 February. The Spanish seized Montezuma and sold her. At the time of her capture Catharine had held 450 casks of oil. The Americans put the oil from Hector, Catharine, and Montezuma aboard Policy and sent her to the United States. However, the Royal Navy recaptured Policy before she could reach an American port.

Citations and references
Citations

References
 
 
Porter, David (1815) Journal of a cruise made to the Pacific ocean in the United States frigate Essex: in the years 1812, 1813, and 1814, Volumes 1-2. (Bradford and Inskeep).
Porter, David Dixon (1875) Memoir of Commodore David Porter: Of the United States Navy. (J.Munsell)

1809 ships
Ships built in the United States
Age of Sail merchant ships of England
Whaling ships
Captured ships